Charles Augustus Boyle (August 13, 1907 – November 4, 1959) was a US Representative from Chicago's north side who represented Illinois's 12th congressional district from 1955 to his death in a car accident.

Boyle was born in Spring Lake, Michigan on August 13, 1907, the son of Rose (née Marsh) and Michael Melvin Boyle. His paternal grandparents were Irish. Boyle was a Democrat and the father of eight children.

First elected in 1954, Boyle was in his third term and was on his way home on November 4, 1959, after he had campaigned for his fellow Democrats in elections the day before. He died after his car had crashed into an elevated train pillar on North Western Avenue. Police speculated that Boyle had either fallen asleep or been cut off by another car. The 12th district went unrepresented for more than a year until after the 1960 general elections, when the Democrat Edward Rowan Finnegan defeated Theodore P. Fields.

He and his wife, Helen L. (Shaughnessy), were the grandparents of actress Lara Flynn Boyle.

See also
 List of United States Congress members who died in office (1950–99)

References

1907 births
1959 deaths
American people of Irish descent
Road incident deaths in Illinois
Democratic Party members of the United States House of Representatives from Illinois
20th-century American politicians
Michigan Democrats
People from Spring Lake, Michigan